Petoa is a municipality in the Honduran department of Santa Bárbara.

Demographics
At the time of the 2013 Honduras census, Petoa municipality had a population of 12,135. Of these, 83.87% were Mestizo, 15.18% White, 0.68% Indigenous, 0.20% Black or Afro-Honduran and 0.07% others.

References

Municipalities of the Santa Bárbara Department, Honduras